The Arkansas International Tennis Tournament was a men's tennis tournament played at Burns Park in North Little Rock, Arkansas in the United States from 1974 to 1979.  The event was part of the Grand Prix tennis circuit from 1977 through 1979 and was played on indoor carpet courts. From 1977 onward the tournament was also known under its sponsored name Fairfield Bay Classic.

Past finals

Singles

Doubles

Notes

References

External links
 Association of Tennis Professionals (ATP) results archive
 ITF Vault

Grand Prix tennis circuit
Defunct tennis tournaments in the United States
Tennis in Arkansas
1974 establishments in Arkansas
1979 disestablishments in Arkansas
Recurring sporting events established in 1974
Recurring sporting events disestablished in 1979
North Little Rock, Arkansas
Sports in Little Rock, Arkansas